Miikka Tuomainen (born May 22, 1986) is a Finnish former professional ice hockey forward.

Tuomainen played in the SM-liiga in Finland for Lukko, HIFK and HC TPS. He was drafted 204th by the Atlanta Thrashers in the 2004 NHL Entry Draft.

Career statistics

Regular season and playoffs

International

References

External links

1986 births
Living people
Atlanta Thrashers draft picks
Finnish ice hockey right wingers
HIFK players
Kiekko-Vantaa players
EHC Klostersee players
Lukko players
Sportspeople from Turku
HC TPS players
TuTo players